Daoli District is one of nine districts of the prefecture-level city of Harbin, the capital of Heilongjiang Province, Northeast China, forming part of the city's urban core. It is located on the Songhua River. It borders the districts of Songbei to the north, Daowai to the northeast, Nangang to the east, and Shuangcheng to the south, as well as the prefecture-level city of Suihua to the northwest.

Nowadays, Daoli District is also famous because of Central Street, which is one of the main business streets in Harbin.

Administrative divisions
There are 19 subdistricts and four towns in the district:

Subdistricts

Towns
Taiping
Xinfa
Xinnong
Yushu

References

External links
Daoli District government official website

Districts of Harbin